The Wild West Relay is a 200-mile team running relay race held annually in August following a rural course in northern Colorado and southern Wyoming between Fort Collins and Steamboat Springs, Colorado. First organized the event is now capped at 100 teams (of either 12 or 6 runners). The remote and scenic course begins on the plains north of Fort Collins. From there, the course winds north through Red Feather Lakes to Woods Landing, Wyoming, then south through Routt and Roosevelt National Forests, through Walden, Colorado, over the Continental Divide at Rabbit Ears Pass, and finishes in Steamboat Springs, Colorado.

References

External links
 Wild West Relay

Endurance games
Relay races